Podgorny is a rural locality (a settlement) in Churovskoye Rural Settlement, Sheksninsky District, Vologda Oblast, Russia. The population was 537 as of 2002.

Geography 
Podgorny is located 14 km northeast of Sheksna (the district's administrative centre) by road. Churovskoye is the nearest rural locality.

References 

Rural localities in Sheksninsky District